"Heatseeker" is a song by Australian hard rock band AC/DC. The song appeared on their 1988 album Blow Up Your Video as the first track. The song was later on Live. The song was also released as a single in various formats, with "Go Zone" as the main B-side. On reaching No.12 in the UK singles chart in 1988, it became their biggest UK chart hit and remained so for 25 years until "Highway to Hell" reached No.4 in December 2013.

Track listing

Music video
In the music video, directed by David Mallet, Angus Young explodes from a life-sized television set. He throws his hat, and it lands on a switch, causing it to flip. A missile is launched, and on the screen is film footage of the Strategic Air Command in the 1950s, 1960s and 1970s. The missile reveals to be a cruise missile, and travels across the world, whereupon it finally crashes into the Opera House in Sydney, during an AC/DC concert. Angus explodes out of the giant missile's warhead and does a guitar solo. At the end, Angus heads back into the missile's nose cone and leaves.

Chart Positions

Personnel
Brian Johnson – vocals
Angus Young – lead guitar
Malcolm Young – rhythm guitar, backing vocals
Cliff Williams – bass guitar, backing vocals
Simon Wright – drums

References

AC/DC songs
1988 singles
Songs written by Brian Johnson
Songs written by Angus Young
Songs written by Malcolm Young
Song recordings produced by Harry Vanda
Song recordings produced by George Young (rock musician)
1987 songs
Atlantic Records singles
Music videos directed by David Mallet (director)